Khadijeh may refer to:
 Khadijeh, Howmeh-ye Sharqi